Georgenberg is a municipality in the district of Neustadt an der Waldnaab in Bavaria in Germany, on the border with the Czech Republic.

References

Neustadt an der Waldnaab (district)